The Charta Oecumenica (Latin for "Ecumenical Charter") is a joint document from the Conference of European Churches (CEC) and the Council of European Episcopal Conferences (CCEE, Consilium Conferentiarum Episcoporum Europae) which contains guidelines for increasing co-operation among the churches in Europe. It was signed by the presidents of the CEC and the CCEE on 22 April 2001 (Sunday after Easter) on the occasion of the European ecumenical meeting in Strasbourg.

External links 
 Text of the Charta Oecumenica

Christianity in Europe
Christian ecumenism